Thailand will participate in the 2011 Asian Winter Games in Almaty and Astana, Kazakhstan from January 30, 2011 to February 6, 2011.

Figure skating

Men

Women

Ice hockey

Men
The team is in the premier division for these games.

Premier Division

All times are local (UTC+6).

References

Nations at the 2011 Asian Winter Games
Asian Winter Games
Thailand at the Asian Winter Games